Saint-Esprit Aerodrome  is located adjacent to Saint-Esprit, Quebec, Canada.

References

Registered aerodromes in Lanaudière